Bohumil Slavíček (born December 30, 1991) is a Czech professional ice hockey player for TEV Miesbach of the Regionalliga.

Slavíček previously played twelve games in the Czech Extraliga, four with HC Slavia Praha and eight with Piráti Chomutov.

References

External links

1991 births
Living people
Czech ice hockey forwards
SHK Hodonín players
HC Most players
Piráti Chomutov players
HC Slavia Praha players
Sportovní Klub Kadaň players
Sportspeople from Ústí nad Labem
Starbulls Rosenheim players
Czech expatriate ice hockey players in Germany